The Aloe is a novel written by Katherine Mansfield.  A longer version of her short story "Prelude", it was edited and published posthumously by her husband John Middleton Murry in 1930.

C. K. Stead's 2004 biographical novel Mansfield: A Novel focuses in part on Mansfield's efforts, during the years 1915 to 1918, to write The Aloe.

References

External links
The Aloe at the New Zealand Electronic Text Centre

1930 novels
Alfred A. Knopf books
Novels published posthumously